Le Pied-tendre is a Lucky Luke comic written by Goscinny and illustrated by Morris. The original comic in French was published by Dargaud in 1968. English translations titled The Tenderfoot have been published by Dargaud and Cinebook Ltd.

Plot
When Baddy, the owner of a naturally-rich piece of land, dies, his heir, Waldo Badminton, a tenderfoot, leaves from England to take possession of his ranch. This newcomer is not to the liking of Jack Ready, who was waiting to buy Baddy's ranch, a good reason to try to bully the newcomer! This one, contrary to expectations, makes his way in the Far West, aided by Lucky Luke, his butler Jasper and Sam, an Indian who served Baddy after he saved him from a massacre. Jack Ready then fakes his death and has Waldo accused. The ruse is quickly discovered by Lucky Luke, giving the opportunity to hold a pistol duel in European style. Defeated, Ready and his sidekick leave town. Another tenderfoot then arrives from England, who Waldo dislikes, and gives the same tenderfoot treatment as he was given.

Characters 

 Waldo Badmington: The tenderfoot, looks like Albert Uderzo. The latter was amused but Morris later said it is only a coincidence.
 Jasper: Waldo's long-suffering butler.
 Sam: An Indian. Baddy saved his life when he was young, devoting him to Baddy and Waldo.
 Jack Ready: Wants to take possession of Baddy's land, which adjoins his.
George: The town barkeeper and a henchman of Jack Ready.
Lloyd Jefferson: Waldo's great-uncle, Baddy's lawyer, he reveals Waldo's existence and claim to the rest.
Old Baddy (real name Harold Lucius Badmington): Waldo's dead great-uncle and the former owner of Waldo's ranch. He left England due to a family scandal and settled in the U.S.A.

References

 Morris publications in Spirou BDoubliées

External links
Lucky Luke official site album index 
Goscinny website on Lucky Luke

Comics by Morris (cartoonist)
Lucky Luke albums
1968 graphic novels
Works originally published in Spirou (magazine)
Works by René Goscinny